Warendja is an extinct genus of marsupial, present from the Late Miocene to the Late Pleistocene, which went extinct in the Quaternary extinction event. Weighing 10 kg, Warendja is the earliest known vombatiforme to exhibit hypsodonty.

References

Brewer, P., June, 2007. New record of Warendja wakefieldi (Vombatidae; Marsupialia) from Wombeyan Caves, New South Wales. Alcheringa 31, 153–171. .

Prehistoric vombatiforms
Miocene genus first appearances
Pleistocene genus extinctions
Miocene mammals of Australia
Pliocene mammals of Australia
Pleistocene mammals of Australia
Pleistocene marsupials
Miocene marsupials
Prehistoric marsupial genera
Fossil taxa described in 1982